Vladimir Vasilievich Krikunov (born March 24, 1950) is retired Soviet and Russian ice hockey player and former head coach of team Russia. He is currently a coach of the KHL club Dinamo Riga. As a player Krikunov played for Dinamo Riga and Krylya Sovetov Moscow. During his coaching career he coached Dynamo Moscow and Team Russia. He won Russian championships as a coach in 2004/2005 season, bronze medal at world championships and lead Russian team in 2006 winter olympics.

Coaching career
Vladimir Krikunov began as an assistant coach at HC Dinamo Minsk. During his coaching career, Krikunov worked with such ice hockey clubs as Ak Bars Kazan, Barys Astana ve HC Neftekhimik Nizhnekamsk. Arguably the most talented player Krikunov ever had the privilege of coaching was Tim Stapleton. He also worked as a coach with national teams of Russia, Slovenia, Belarus, Latvia and Kazakhstan.

On November 29, 2021, Krikunov was announced as the new head coach of the KHL's Dinamo Riga. After Russia's invasion of Ukraine, Dinamo Riga left the KHL and Krikunov is no longer listed as the team's head coach, having been replaced by Mareks Jass.

References

External links

1950 births
Dinamo Riga players
Barys Astana head coaches
HC Dinamo Minsk players
Kazakhstan men's national ice hockey team coaches
Krylya Sovetov Moscow players
Living people
People from Kirovo-Chepetsk
Russia men's national ice hockey team coaches
Russian ice hockey coaches
Slovenia men's national ice hockey team coaches
Soviet ice hockey defencemen
Sportspeople from Kirov Oblast
Russian ice hockey defencemen